William Luhr is an American film author and professor and the author of such works as Thinking About Movies: Watching, Questioning, Enjoying, World Cinema Since 1945: An Encyclopedic History and Returning to the Scene.  He is also currently a professor of English at Saint Peter's College in Jersey City, New Jersey.

Selected publications
 Authorship and Narrative in the Cinema: Issues in Contemporary Aesthetics and Criticism (with Peter Lehman, 1977)
 Blake Edwards (with Peter Lehman, 1981)
 Raymond Chandler and Film (1982)
 World Cinema Since 1945: An Encyclopedic History (1987)
 Returning to the Scene: Blake Edwards, Volume 2 (with Peter Lehman, 1989)

References

Saint Peter's University faculty
Living people
Year of birth missing (living people)